The Irish Deaf Society (IDS) is the national representative organisation of the Deaf community in Ireland.  It upholds the status of Irish Sign Language (ISL), which is the first and preferred language of Deaf people in Ireland.  The Society, a growing and vital organization, provides a number of specific health, personal and social services to deaf adults, children and their families.

The IDS is recognised by the World Federation of the Deaf and The European Union of the Deaf, non-governmental organisations that represent National Associations of the Deaf at the world and European Union levels.

Purpose
The IDS seeks to enhance the standard of living and quality of life for all Deaf people.  The Society recognizes that the Deaf have traditionally faced the threats of poverty, limited employment opportunities, and other difficulties because of the lack of public understanding or appreciation for their essential needs.  Therefore, their mission statement reads:

See also
 Deaf culture
 European Union of the Deaf
 Hearing loss
 Irish Sign Language
 National Association of the Deaf (United States)
 World Federation of the Deaf

References

External links
 http://www.deaf.ie (Irish Deaf Society website)

Deafness organizations
1981 establishments in Ireland
Organizations established in 1981
Organisations based in Dublin (city)
Deaf culture in Ireland
Seanad nominating bodies